"3 2 1" is the ninth Japanese single by South Korean boy group Shinee. The single was released on December 4, 2013 by Universal Music Japan sublabel EMI Records Japan and is an OST for the Japanese drama Tokyo Toy Box.

Background and release
On October 10, 2013 EMI Records Japan announced Shinee's ninth single, "3 2 1". On October 5, the song started playing as the theme song for the TV Tokyo drama Tokyo Toy Box. The short version of the music video was released on September 11, 2013.

According to the Japanese chart Oricon, Shinee sold 42,216 copies of their single on the first day of release. It landed them in third place on the chart.

Track listing

Chart performance

Charts

Oricon chart

Release history

References

2013 singles
Shinee songs
SM Entertainment singles
Japanese-language songs
2013 songs
Songs written by Damon Sharpe
Songs written by Eric Sanicola